"Hills and Valleys" is a song performed by American Christian pop artist Tauren Wells. It was released on January 20, 2017, as the third single from Wells' debut studio album, Hills and Valleys (2017). Wells co-wrote the song with Chuck Butler and Jonathan Smith.

"Hills and Valleys" peaked at number three on the US Hot Christian Songs chart. "Hills and Valleys" garnered a Grammy Award nomination for Best Contemporary Christian Music Performance/Song at the 2018 Grammy Awards.

Background

Tauren Wells released "Hills and Valleys" as a multi-track single, containing the original recording as found on the Undefeated EP; a remix version titled "The Hills Remix," and an acoustic piano-driven rendition dubbed "The Valleys Version." Tauren Wells shared the story behind the song, saying:

Composition

Accolades

Music videos
Tauren Wells released the official acoustic video of "Hills and Valleys" on January 20, 2017, via YouTube. On January 27, 2017, Tauren Wells published an official lyric video YouTube. On June 23, 2017, Wells released audio videos for the original recording, the Hills Remix and the Valley Version of the song on YouTube. On April 30, 2021, Wells released an official live performance video that shows Wells performing the song and filmed at Lakewood Church in Houston, Texas.

Track listing

Charts

Weekly charts

Year-end charts

Certifications

Release history

References

External links

2017 songs
2017 singles
Tauren Wells songs
Songs written by Tauren Wells
Songs written by Chuck Butler